The General Simon Elliot House is a historic house at 61 Heath Street in Brookline, Massachusetts. Built in 1824, it is one of the town's oldest examples of Greek Revival architecture, owned by several prominent residents. The house was listed on the National Register of Historic Places on October 17, 1985.

Description and history
The General Simon Elliott House is located on a residential street in Brookline's Woodland-Heath area, at the western corner of Heath Street and Reservoir Road. A low stone wall runs along the street-facing edges of the property. The core of the house is a -story wood frame Greek Revival cottage, with a gabled roof and clapboarded exterior. Although the modern main entrance is on the left side as seen from the street, the original main entrance was on the street-facing south facade, sheltered by a single-story Greek Revival porch. The current main entrance is at the center of the left facade, sheltered by a rectangular Colonial Revival portico. Stylistic alterations to the exterior include Gothic-arched details, steeply pitched gabled dormers, and Colonial Revival window framing.

The house was built in 1824 by General Simon Elliot (1762–1832), a descendant of Scottish immigrants, who served in the American Revolutionary War. Elliot was a prominent local merchant as well as a mill and factory owner, who later served as a Major General in the Massachusetts Militia. Following the revolution, on 13 December 1786, he was appointed by Gov. James Bowdoin as an adjutant in the militia with the rank of captain under the command of General Benjamin Lincoln to put down Shays' Rebellion. He was a Lieutenant Colonel in 1798 when making recommendations on Army appointments.

It is the oldest Greek Revival house in Brookline.

See also
National Register of Historic Places listings in Brookline, Massachusetts

References

Houses completed in 1824
Houses in Brookline, Massachusetts
National Register of Historic Places in Brookline, Massachusetts
Houses on the National Register of Historic Places in Norfolk County, Massachusetts
Greek Revival architecture in Massachusetts